Liptapanlop Hall is an indoor sporting arena and located in His Majesty the King's 80th Birthday Anniversary, 5 December 2007, Sports Complex, Nakhon Ratchasima, Thailand. The arena name after the surname of thai politician who official based in Nakhon Ratchasima, Suwat Liptapanlop. The capacity of the arena is 2,000 spectators. 

It is used mainly for boxing, basketball, futsal, and volleyball.

References

Indoor arenas in Thailand
Indoor Stadium Huamark
Basketball venues in Thailand
Volleyball venues in Thailand
Boxing venues in Thailand